Karol Jabłoński (born August 25, 1962 in Giżycko, Poland) Polish regatta helmsman, skipper, ice sailor. One of the most versatile sailors, succeeded in sea sailing, match racing and ice sailing. Several time World and European champion. Recognised in the international sailing environment, participating in international regattas. Started his career in the Baza Mrągowo sailing club, current representative of Olsztyn Sailing Club.

Sailing career 
His early career began on the lake in Tałty. In 2007, as the first Polish skipper, competed in prestigious regatta – America’s Cup. In the 2007 America's Cup in Valencia he was the helmsman of the host team Desafío Español and placed 3rd in the challenger regatta 2007 Louis Vuitton Cup. In 2007 was the helmsman at United Internet Germany which was preparing for the 33rd America’s Cup.

In the years 2009–2010 the helmsman of Team Synergy, succeeding with the Russian team in the Louis Vuitton Trophy.

In 2002 won the ISAF Open Match Racing World Championship with Polish crew and went on to lead the ISAF ranking during 18 months of record streak. In years 2001–2002 he was the skipper of “Polska 1” team planning to start in the America’s Cup.

A multiple medallist different sea sailing yacht classes and winner of various international regatta in the following yacht classes:

·       One Tone,

·       50’,

·       Mumm 36,

·       ILC 46,

·       ILC 40,

·       Sydney 40,

·       Wally and Swan

·       TP52

Winner of i.a. Admiral’s Cup, Commodores’ Cup, Copa del Rey, Kiel Week, Sardinias Cup, SORC, Palmavella, Zegna Trophy. In Atlanta 1996 he was the consultant coach of the Polish Olympic team and had a share in the gold medal of Mateusz Kusznierewicz in the Finn class.

The most titled ice sailor in the DN class history.

Summary of sailing career

Match Racing

DN Class Ice Sailing

World Championships

European Championships

References

External links
http://karoljablonski.pl/

1962 births
Living people
Polish male sailors (sport)
People from Mrągowo
Sportspeople from Warmian-Masurian Voivodeship
2007 America's Cup sailors